Etherington is a surname. Notable people with the surname include:

Etherington (cricketer), 19th-century English cricketer
Craig Etherington, (born 1979), English footballer
Gary Etherington (born 1958), former English-American soccer player
Ivor Malcolm Haddon Etherington (1908–1994) British mathematician and geneticist
Jade Etherington (born 1991), British Paralympic skier
Juliet Etherington (born 1979), New Zealand shooting competitor
Matthew Etherington (born 1981), English footballer
Meredith Etherington-Smith (1946–2020), British art and fashion journalist
Robert Etherington (1899–1981), English footballer
Bill Etherington (born 1941), British politician

See also
 Wedderburn–Etherington number, an integer sequence
 Mount Etherington, a mountain in Western Canada